Rhacolepis is an extinct genus of ray-finned fish from the Cretaceous Santana Formation of Brazil. Complete fossilised hearts from this species have been recovered.

References 

Crossognathiformes
Prehistoric ray-finned fish genera
Cretaceous bony fish
Prehistoric fish of South America
Cretaceous Brazil
Fossils of Brazil
Romualdo Formation
Fossil taxa described in 1843
Taxa named by Louis Agassiz